Lucia Slaničková-Vadlejch (born 8 November 1988, in Považská Bystrica) is a retired Slovak athlete who specialises in the heptathlon.

Slaničková currently holds the national indoor record for the 4 × 400 metres relay.

International competitions

References

External links 

 

1988 births
Living people
Sportspeople from Považská Bystrica
Slovak heptathletes
European Games silver medalists for Slovakia
Athletes (track and field) at the 2015 European Games
European Games medalists in athletics
Competitors at the 2015 Summer Universiade
Athletes (track and field) at the 2019 European Games